Lovell High School is a public high school in Lovell, Wyoming, United States. The campus serves students in grades nine through twelve and is part of Big Horn County School District #2. Their mascot is the Bulldog. In September 2009 they moved down to the 2A size classification.

References

External links

Public high schools in Wyoming
Schools in Big Horn County, Wyoming